Cill Pheadair, meaning 'Peter's church', may refer to:

 Kilpedder, County Wicklow, Ireland, a village 
 Kilphedir, Sutherland, Scotland, a remote settlement